Vladislav Vladimirovich Leontyev (born July 5, 1971 in Gorky) is a Russian gangster linked to drug trafficking, embezzlement, fraud, extortion and car theft. In 2012 the Obama administration of the United States imposed sanctions on Leontyev as a central figure in a transnational crime gang called Brothers' Circle, along with six other men linked to various syndicates tied into the Circle, and Japanese yakuza leaders Kenichi Shinoda and Kiyoshi Takayama.

References

Russian gangsters
1971 births
People from Nizhny Novgorod
Living people